The 1924–25 Indiana Hoosiers men's basketball team represented Indiana University. Their head coach was Everett Dean, who was in his 1st year. The team played its home games at the Men's Gymnasium in Bloomington, Indiana, and was a member of the Big Ten Conference.

The Hoosiers finished the regular season with an overall record of 12–5 and a conference record of 8–4, finishing 2nd in the Big Ten Conference.

Roster

Schedule/Results

|-
!colspan=8| Regular Season
|-

References

Indiana
Indiana Hoosiers men's basketball seasons
1924 in sports in Indiana
1925 in sports in Indiana